Weave may refer to:

Weaving, is a process of interlacing yarns to form a fabric.

Arts and entertainment
Weave (Forgotten Realms), a mechanism for using magic in Dungeons & Dragons fantasy games
Shadow Weave, a force of magic that is the inverse and opposite of the Weave
Weave Magazine, an American literary magazine based in Pittsburgh
Big Daddy Weave, a contemporary Christian band composed of Mike Weaver (lead singer), Jay Weaver, Jeremy Redmon, Joe Shirk, and Brian Beihl
Weave and Spin, the first album by folk trio Lady Maisery

Science and technology
Weave (digital printing), a digital printing technique
WEAVE, a secondary program of WEB
Weave (protocol), an internet of things communication protocol
Mozilla Weave, a browser synchronization feature
Weave merge, a merging algorithm

Other uses
Weave (consultancy), a French company which provides operational strategy consulting services
Hair weave, an artificial hair integration
Bob and weave, a boxing maneuver 
Weave Bridge, a bridge at The University of Pennsylvania, US
Thach Weave, an aerial combat tactic developed by naval aviator John S. Thach
Unweave the Weave, a road construction project of the Minnesota Department of Transportation
Weave of events, a number of actions and their effects that are contiguous and linked together that results in a particular outcome
Weave poles, in the sport of dog agility

See also 
"we've", a commonly used contraction of "we have"
weev (born 1985), internet troll
Dreamweaver (disambiguation)